Sun Way Flight 4412 was an international scheduled cargo flight from Karachi, Pakistan, to Khartoum, Sudan. On 28 November 2010, the Ilyushin Il-76 operating the flight crashed while attempting to return to Karachi after one of the engines catastrophically failed shortly after take-off. Twelve people were killed in the crash: everyone on board the aircraft and four people on the ground. The engine failure was caused by metal fatigue resulting from operation of the engine beyond its design life.

Accident
Flight 4412 departed Karachi's Jinnah International Airport at 01:48 local time (20:48 UTC, 27 November) bound for Khartoum International Airport. The Ilyushin Il-76TD was carrying 31 tonnes of relief supplies for Sudan, reported to be a cargo of tents. The crew of eight was composed of Russian and Ukrainian members.

Eyewitnesses saw that one of the starboard engines was on fire as the aircraft climbed out of Jinnah. Rescue authorities confirmed that four people were killed that were not on board the aircraft.

The force of the explosion was so great that local residents thought that a bomb had exploded. The ground casualties were reported to be construction workers.

Aircraft
The aircraft involved was an Ilyushin Il-76TD with Georgian registration 4L-GNI, that was being operated by Sun Way, a Georgian cargo airline. The aircraft was reported as having undergone a thorough technical inspection in the two weeks prior to the accident.

Victims

Investigation
The Civil Aviation Authority of Pakistan conducted an investigation into the accident. It emerged that the certified design life of the airframe and engines had expired in 2004, seven years before the accident, and that since then the aircraft had been operated without the manufacturer's approval. The weight of the Il-76 at take-off also exceeded by 5 tons the maximum allowed of 190 tons.

The investigation determined that the accident sequence started with an uncontained failure of the second stage disk of the low-pressure compressor of engine number four, shortly after take-off. The failure was attributed to metal fatigue and was considered a direct result of the operation of the engine well past its design life.

Debris ejected by the failed engine struck the right wing, damaging the flaps and piercing the fuel tanks. Fuel from the tanks ignited, further damaging the wing and flight controls to the extent that control of the aircraft could no longer be maintained. The aircraft then rolled out of control to the right and crashed to the ground.

Notes

References

Aviation accidents and incidents in 2010
Aviation accidents and incidents in Pakistan
2010 in Pakistan
Accidents and incidents involving the Ilyushin Il-76
Jinnah International Airport
November 2010 events in Pakistan
Airliner accidents and incidents involving uncontained engine failure